Łukasz Turzyniecki (born 25 March 1994) is a Polish professional footballer who plays as a defender for Legia Warsaw II.

Club career
In his two stints with Legia Warsaw he never appeared for the main squad in an Ekstraklasa game, but made appearances in the Polish Cup.

On 31 July 2020, he signed a two-year deal with Zagłębie Sosnowiec. On 23 May 2022, it was announced he would leave the team at the end of his contract.

On 1 July 2022, he moved to Olimpia Elbląg on a one-year deal with an extension option.

On 30 January 2023, he re-joined Legia Warsaw II.

References

1994 births
People from Krasnystaw
Sportspeople from Lublin Voivodeship
Living people
Polish footballers
Association football defenders
Legia Warsaw II players
Legia Warsaw players
Wisła Puławy players
Widzew Łódź players
Zagłębie Sosnowiec players
Olimpia Elbląg players
I liga players
II liga players
III liga players